San Casimiro de Güiripa is a city in the state of Aragua, Venezuela. It is the shire town of the San Casimiro Municipality. It is named after Saint Casimir. 

Cities in Aragua